Apostolic Church Fullness of God's Throne (In Portuguese: Igreja Apostólica Plenitude do Trono de Deus or IAPTD) is a Neo-charismatic denomination founded in Brazil in 2006, by Agenor Duque and Ingrid Duque.

History 
Agenor Duque, former Minister of the World Church of the Power of God, (Igreja Mundial do Poder de Deus) has God-given a call for a new church. And followed his dream by following this vision he told his wife about what God had shown, believing in life called the bridegroom and his call to Ingrid Bishop dropped his personal dreams and projects, to live next to one of the bridegroom God's direction for their lives and their ministry, and thus founded the Apostolic Church Fullness of God's Throne on 7 September 2006.

Media 
The church rents programming on radio and television.

Radio 
Acquired much of the programming of radio FM Musical, during the morning.

Television 
Rented a few hours on television channels Mix TV, and on Saturdays on Channel Rede TV!.

Congress Revival Fire 
Congress Revival Fire for Brazil is an event organized by IAPTD, led by the apostle Agenor Duque and bishop Ingrid Duque. In the 5th edition in 2013 occurred on days 9, 12 and 13 January, and with the participation of the Israeli pastor and evangelist Benny Hinn and pastors Marco Feliciano, Abilio Santana and Yossef Akiva, and the singers: Thalles Roberto, David Quinlan, Cassiane, David Passamani, among others. Currently in 6th edition held between 1 and March 5, 2014, and was attended by various groups and singers of gospel music, and ministers of the word of God.

References

External links
 Official website
 

Protestantism in Brazil
Protestant denominations
Pentecostal denominations in South America
Pentecostal churches in Brazil